Buckingham Group Contracting Ltd is a construction company located near Stowe, between Buckingham and Silverstone in north Buckinghamshire which operates throughout England and Wales.

Established originally in 1955 as Buckingham Plant Hire, it incorporated in November 1987 as Buckingham Group Contracting Ltd.  The company is now established as a Main Contractor undertaking major construction and civil engineering projects, run by managing director Ian McSeveney.

The company has built several sports related buildings in recent years including the £30m London 2012 Olympic handball arena (now known as the Copper Box), a £30m pit lane development for the Silverstone Circuit, and the £93m Falmer Stadium for Brighton and Hove Albion FC.

References

External links
 

Companies based in Buckinghamshire
Construction and civil engineering companies established in 1987
Construction and civil engineering companies of England
1987 establishments in England
British companies established in 1987